() or Route 31 is a national road in the Southern Region of Iceland. It runs from Route 30, through the village of Laugarás to the intersection of Biskupstungnabraut. It passed Skálholt, an historic place in Southern Iceland, and is named after it.

References

Roads in Iceland